Circle Surrogacy & Egg Donation is a US-based surrogacy and egg donation agency headquartered in Boston, Massachusetts. Circle Surrogacy carries an audited success rate for intended parents having a baby at 99.3%.

History
Circle Surrogacy was founded in 1995 in Boston, Massachusetts by John Weltman. Prior to establishing the agency, Weltman and his husband had children through surrogacy.

Circle Surrogacy’s first baby was born to a heterosexual couple from Massachusetts. Circle Surrogacy delivered its first baby born to a single gay man and first gestational surrogate baby born to a heterosexual couple.

 From 1995 to 2000, John Weltman operates as the facilitator for surrogacy, and during this time period, Circle Surrogacy began to help people find egg donors for pure egg donation.

 2000 - Circle Surrogacy officially named. The name is inspired by The Lion King, which John’s son loved at the time.

 2001 - Circle’s first egg donor surrogacy baby is born to a gay couple.

 2010 - Circle moves out of the law offices at Lawson & Weitzen and into its present home in downtown Boston.

 2019 - Circle opens offices in New York and San Francisco Bay Area, CA.

 2019 - Circle reaches its 2000th baby birth.

Programs offered by Circle Surrogacy & Egg Donation (services)
Circle Surrogacy provides services for intended parents & gestational carriers from the application and screening process through post-birth. As a full-service agency founded by a lawyer, Circle Surrogacy also provides legal services for clients in any of the surrogacy programs that Circle Surrogacy & Egg Donation provides.

Intended parents program
Option Consideration under the Intended Parents Program are as follows:

 Gestational Surrogacy
 Gestational Surrogacy with Egg Donation
 Surrogates Programs

Circle Surrogacy follows the strict guidelines established by the American Society for Reproductive Medicine (ASRM). The American Society for Reproductive Medicine (ASRM) is a multidisciplinary organization dedicated to the advancement of the science and practice of reproductive medicine. It provides a forum for the public, researchers, physicians and affiliated health workers through education, publications, and meetings. 

The types of intended parents' surrogate mothers help are:
 Heterosexual couples who have struggled with infertility
 Intended mothers who are unable to carry a child
 Intended parents, who have a genetic defect or health condition they don't want to pass onto the child
 Same sex intended parents who want to have a genetic link to the baby

Surrogate applicants also participate in screenings with a social worker and complete psychological testing.

Egg donor programs
Circle Surrogacy offers an Egg Donor Program for persons who want to donate eggs or who need an egg donor.

Industry scope historical review
Surrogacy is an arrangement, often supported by a legal agreement, whereby a woman agrees to bear a child for another person or persons, who will become the child's parent after birth.  The surrogacy industry originally started as early as 1978, when the first baby was successfully conceived through an IVF transfer.

In 1980, an establishment for a “compensated-surrogacy” was concluded, reporting a successful transition, outlining an agreement between the two parties (traditional surrogate and the intended parents) rewarding a total of $10,000 to successfully carry and deliver a baby for the intended couples/parents.

Technological advancements led to increased surrogacy methodologies. The number of surrogacy agencies increased, providing surrogacy services for both females and males, regardless of their sexual preferences or orientation.

See also
 Surrogacy
 Egg donation
 Surrogate marriage
 Sexual surrogate
 Surrogacy laws by country
 Third-party reproduction

References

Surrogacy
Companies based in Boston
American companies established in 1995
1995 establishments in Massachusetts